City Mart Holdings (CMHL) is one of Myanmar’s largest retail outlet, employing more than 8,000 employees. The City Mart Group started as a modern supermarket in 1996 in the north wing of Bogyoke Aung San Stadium but has since expanded into many different aspects of modern retail trade such as supermarkets, pharmacies, bookstores, baby stores, convenience stores and bakery & coffee shops. The stores are primarily located in the cities of Yangon, Mandalay and NaypyitawNow it also expanded in some major towns in Upper Myanmar.

City Mart Holdings Co., Ltd. was ranked 31 in Myanmar for the fiscal year 13/14 Income Tax Ranking, and 5 for the Commercial Tax Ranking Myanmar Index.

Businesses under CMHL

City Mart Supermarkets
The City Mart Supermarkets are catered to urban households focusing on food and lifestyle. As of 2016, 26 City Mart Supermarkets have opened in Yangon and Mandalay. Many City Mart Supermarkets have pop-up stores inside them for beauty products, pharmacy, wine & spirits, kitchen utensils etc. Most stores have a wide selection of foreign products.

Ocean Supercenters
Ocean Supercenter was the first hypermarket to open in Myanmar in 2006. They are known as the one-stop place for shopping food, clothing, beauty products, household products and much more. As of 2016, there are 10 Ocean Super centers located in Yangon, Mandalay, Naypyidaw, Monywar, Mawlamyaing and Pathein.

marketplace by City Mart
Marketplaces by City Mart offer a wider range of international and premium products in Yangon. They offer special treats like locally produced coffee and chocolate products. Opened in 2011 as a premium supermarket brand in the Golden Valley shopping center. The second outlet opened in 2013 at the FMI Center Parkson.

City Baby Clubs
City Baby Clubs sell daily essentials, accessories, toys and food products for mothers and baby care. The Baby Club has expanded to 6 outlets in Yangon and Mandalay.

City Care
City Care pharmacies provide pharmaceutical products, beauty and health products. There are 35 City Care stores in Yangon, Mandalay, Naypyidaw, Monywar, Mawlamyaing and Pathein.

City Books & Music
Local bookstore and music chain providing Myanmar-focused books and magazines as well as original music of both local and international musicians. There are 13 City Books & Music outlets.

Seasons Bakery
Seasons Bakery provides freshly baked goods. Seasons outlets have expanded to 34 outlets.

City Express
A convenience store chain opened 24-hours that currently operates 52 outlets in Yangon. City Express started as a mini-shop outlet and opened in April 2011 on Hledan Road in Yangon. Rebranded as City Express in 2013.

City Mall Online 
CMHL decided to step up into the E-Commerce sector and launch the beta version of City Mall Online (https://www.citymall.com.mm) in April 2017. Then City Mall Online was upgraded into a new platform in January 2018 and is currently using that version to serve their customers.

CSR activities 
The company started the City Love & Hope Foundation in 2013 to provide support in the following areas to the communities:
 Education
 Health 
 Environment 
 Community Livelihood

References

External links
 City Mart Supermarket
 Ocean Supercenter
 Marketplace by City Mart
 City Baby Club
 City Care
 City Books & Music
 Popular Bookstore
 Seasons Bakery
 City Express
 City Mall Online

Shopping malls and markets in Myanmar
Buildings and structures in Yangon Region
Retail companies of Myanmar
Retail companies established in 1996
1996 establishments in Myanmar